First Congregational Church and Society of Volney, also known as Bristol Hill Church, Congregational United Church of Christ, is a historic Congregational church located at Volney in Oswego County, New York.  It is a frame vernacular Federal style structure built in 1832–1835. It is a two-story structure, rectangular in plan, 40 feet wide and 54 feet deep.  A tower extends from the center of its facade. Except for the loss of its bell, the church is in virtually original condition.  Early members of the church were abolitionists and the church is known to have had African American members dating to the 1820s.

It was listed on the National Register of Historic Places in 2001.

References

External links
Bristol Hill Church website
The Bristol Hill Congregational United Church of Christ - U.S. National Register of Historic Places on waymarking.com

Churches on the National Register of Historic Places in New York (state)
United Church of Christ churches in New York (state)
Federal architecture in New York (state)
Churches completed in 1835
19th-century United Church of Christ church buildings
Churches in Oswego County, New York
National Register of Historic Places in Oswego County, New York
Underground Railroad in New York (state)